Lifestyle was a British daytime television channel aimed at women and families. It was broadcast on cable and from February 1989 on transponder 5 of the Astra satellite.

The channel's logo originally consisted of 3D computer graphics forming a face before when it was relaunched in November 1987, which changes to an animated pastel butterfly and includes the signature flute tune within typifying its gentle pace and reflective colourful style.

History

1985–1989: Early years
Lifestyle was launched on 30 October 1985 and initially available on various cable networks such as Rediffusion Cablevision in parts of the United Kingdom and Cablelink in parts of Ireland. Lifestyle's daytime lineup mainly consisted of magazines, novelas and movies within the programming was linked by an in-vision continuity announcer David Hamilton. By the late 1980s, the channel was showing a range of classic American comedies, crime dramas (such as Divorce Court and Remington Steele) along with film noir classics from the 1940s and 1950s, as well as the daily exercise routine shows such as Charlene Prickett's It Figures and Keep Fit also included. The channel was broadcast from facilities at Molinare, another company owned at the time by WHSmith Group.

1989–1992: Expansion
In August 1989, Lifestyle's transmission time was extended and it aired 10.00am to 6.00pm and this co-incided with the channel becoming more associated with the Sky Television brand by becoming part of its advertising campaigns for the Astra satellite on which the Sky channels and Lifestyle could be seen. The channel broadcast the successful chat show Sally Jessy Raphael along with several popular American gameshows including Classic Concentration, The Joker's Wild, Tic-Tac-Dough and Supermarket Sweep. More recent programming was also acquired, and Australian series including Rafferty's Rules, Cop Shop and Skyways aired along with American soap operas Search for Tomorrow and The Edge of Night.

In 1990, the transponder was used to broadcast the Lifestyle Satellite Jukebox, a music video request channel from 10.00pm to 6.00am. The hours between the ending of Lifestyle's programmes and the start of Satellite Jukebox were filled by the Sell-a-Vision home shopping service. For a time, The Children's Channel also transmitted on transponder 5, airing during the early morning before Lifestyle programming started.

1993: Demise
The channel never achieved huge ratings and closed on 24 January 1993. Its most popular shows were moved to Sky One and Astra's transponder 5 was taken over the following day by German language channel VOX. 

At 7.57pm, continuity announcer Kate Ricketts stated that "this brings us to the end of weekend Lifestyle, and sadly, to the end of the Lifestyle channel". She and David Hamilton also exchanged gifts and both said goodbye to the viewers while thanking them for having made Lifestyle "such a great channel to work for". On the cable broadcast just after 7.59pm, cable operator Videotron added a scrolling message stating:

Credits of every staff member who worked for the channel rolled, before the station ident played one last time and the logo dissolved on air. The transmission ceased immediately at 8.00pm and the VOX logo appeared with text reading 'From 25 January 1993 this channel [is available]', and launched the following day.

Lifestyle's sister network, Screensport was shut down on 1 March. This permanently ended WHSmith's involvement with television. A new women's network called UK Living launched a few months later as part of the Sky Multichannels package on 1 September 1993.

Programming

A–G

 A Better Read
 The Adventures of Jim Bowie
 The Adventures of Long John Silver
 African Wave
 Alcoa Presents: One Step Beyond
 Amazing Discoveries
 Annie Oakley
 The Ante Room
 Arcade
 As Good as New
 Atlantic City
 A Week in the Life of
 A-Z of Gardening
 A-Z of Self Sufficiency
 Baby and Co.
 Basic Training
 The Best of Europe
 The Betty White Show
 Beverly Hills Buntz
 The Bill Dana Show
 Body Talk
 Bracken
 Burke's Law
 Burns and Allen
 Buy Lines
 Calvin and the Colonel
 Captain Gallant of the Foreign Legion
 Captain Power and the Soldiers of the Future
 Car 54, Where Are You?
 Championship Rodeo
 The Cisco Kid
 Classic Concentration
 Coffee Break
 Cop Shop
 Country GP
 Country Ways
 Cover Story
 The Cross-Wits
 Cyril Fletcher's Lifestyle Garden
 The Danny Thomas Show
 Dante
 David Hamilton's People
 The David Niven Show
 The Detectives
 The Dick Van Dyke Show
 Divorce Court
 Do It!
 Doc
 The Doctor
 Dr. Ruth's Good Sex Show
 Dream Chasers
 Dreamers
 The Edge of Night
 The Emergency Room
 Ensign O'Toole
 Everyday Workout
 The Family Tree
 Farmhouse Kitchen
 Fashion File
 Festivals of the World
 Flair
 Flash Gordon
 Focus on Britain
 Formula One
 Galloping Gourmet
 Get Smart
 Getting Fit
 Gloss
 The Good Food Show
 Gorgeous Ladies of Wrestling
 Great Chefs
 The Green Hornet

H–N

 He Shoots, He Scores
 High Rollers
 Hollywood Interview
 Hollywood TV Theatre
 Homeshopping Club
 House Rules
 I Can Jump Puddles
 In Search of Wildlife
 It Figures
 It's a Vet's Life
 It's Your Lifestyle
 Jack Thompson Down Under
 Jackpot
 Jake's Fitness Minute
 Jason of Star Command
 The Joan Rivers Show
 Jocasta Innes' Paint Effects
 Johnny Ringo
 The Joker's Wild
 Keep Fit
 Learned Friends
 Lifestyle Plus
 Lifestyles of the Rich and Famous
 Lunchbox
 Make Room for Daddy
 Making the Most of
 Mary
 McKeever and the Colonel
 Me and My Camera
 The Microwave Cook
 Monte Carlo Circus
 Monty Nash
 The Mothers-in-Law
 Name That Tune
 The New Newlywed Game
 Night in Tunisia
 Northwest Passage

O–U

 On Top of the World
 Paradise Steamship
 Paris
 Parkfield Video Review Show
 Pets and People
 The Phil Donahue Show
 Phyllis
 Pizza Gourmet
 Power Hits USA
 Power Without Glory
 Powerful Women of Wrestling
 Rafferty's Rules
 Rambo: The Force of Freedom
 Remington Steele
 The Rich Also Cry
 Ride on Stranger
 Rocky Jones, Space Ranger
 The Rogues
 Roller Derby
 The Rush Limbaugh Show
 Saints and Sinners
 Sally Jessy Raphael
 Search for Tomorrow
 The Secrets of Isis
 Sell-a-Vision
 Simply Marvellous
 Skyways
 Slim Cooking
 The Smothers Brothers Show
 Space Patrol
 Spain Spain Cookery
 Spain Spain Holiday
 Spain Spain International Cuisine
 Spanish Cocktail
 Spiral Zone
 Star Time
 Style File
 Supermarket Sweep
 Taff Acre
 Take Kerr
 Tea Break
 Telemart
 Three for the Road
 Tic-Tac-Dough
 Tom Corbett, Space Cadet
 The Tom Ewell Show
 The Tony Randall Show
 Top Class
 Travelview Tips
 Underwater World

V–Z

 The Vet
 Video Tours
 Video Visits
 We're Cooking Now
 What's Cooking?
 What's New
 The White Shadow
 Wild, Wild World of Animals
 WKRP in Cincinnati
 Wok with Yan
 Women of the World
 Women of Today
 World Class Championship Wrestling
 The World of Survival
 The World We Live In
 Young People's Specials
 Young Ramsay
 Your Show of Shows
 Zorro's Fighting Legion

See also
 Timeline of cable television in the United Kingdom
 List of European television stations

References

External links
 Lifestyle at TV Ark

Defunct television channels in the United Kingdom
1985 establishments in the United Kingdom
Television channels and stations established in 1985
Television channels and stations disestablished in 1993
1980s in Europe
1980s in the United Kingdom
1980s in British television
1990s in Europe
1990s in the United Kingdom
1990s in British television
History of television in the United Kingdom